Fairy chess is the area of chess composition in which there are "some" changes to the rules of chess. The term was introduced by Henry Tate in 1914. Thomas R. Dawson (1889–1951), the "father of fairy chess", invented many fairy pieces and new conditions. He was also problem editor of Fairy Chess Review (1930–1951).

Although the term "fairy chess" is sometimes used for games, it is more usually applied to problems where the board, pieces, or rules are changed to express an idea or theme impossible in orthodox chess. Variations on chess intended to create complete, playable games are more typically referred to as chess variants.

Types of fairy chess problems 
Types of changed rules in fairy chess problems include:
 New stipulations: The alterations most used by fairy chess players, like Thomas Dawson, are new stipulations about mate instead of a direct mate stipulation. Many of them were invented and some became established. Selfmates and helpmates are, in the 21st century, often considered to be orthodox (not fairy) stipulations. Among others are reflexmates and various types of seriesmovers.
 New conditions: Encompassing all changes of rules including rules for captures, checks, checkmates, general movement abilities. Many were invented; some became established, including Circe chess, Madrasi chess, Andernach chess, monochromatic chess, patrol chess, Einstein chess, and Descartes chess.
 New chess pieces: Conventional chess pieces are generalized in many ways into fairy chess pieces, such as grasshopper, nightrider, and cannon.
 Different boards: One can vary board size from 8×8 to other sizes (10×10, 8×10, unusual board shapes, etc.) or use different geometries: cylinder (vertical and horizontal), anchor ring or torus and others.
There are fairy chess problems that combine some of these changed rules.

All entries in the world championships and in the FIDE Albums are divided into eight sections:  (and ), endgame studies, selfmates, helpmates, fairy chess and retro and mathematical problems.

Fairy chess literature
Books and pamphlets devoted to fairy chess:

Periodicals devoted to fairy chess:
 The Problemist Fairy Supplement (August 1930 – June 1936)
 Fairy Chess Review (August 1936 – April 1958)
 Feenschach, edited by W. Karsch

References 

Bibliography

External links 
 Fairy chess by Michael McDowell
 Fairy chess glossary by Otto Janko
 MetaChess, an open source fairy chess engine

 
Chess variants